Mark Gino Francois (born 14 August 1965) is a British politician. A member of the Conservative Party, he has been the Member of Parliament (MP) for Rayleigh and Wickford, previously Rayleigh, since the 2001 general election.

Francois served as Vice-Chamberlain of the Household (2010–2012), a Minister of State at the Ministry of Defence (2012–2013) and Minister of State for the Armed Forces (2013–2015). He was also Minister of State for Communities and Resilience and Minister for Portsmouth at the Department for Communities and Local Government from 2015 to 2016.

In 2018, he was appointed deputy chair and de facto whip of the eurosceptic European Research Group (ERG) by chair Jacob Rees-Mogg. He was a critic of the leadership of Theresa May during her time as leader of the Conservative Party. In March 2020 he became the Chair of the ERG.

Early life and career
Mark Gino Francois was born on 14 August 1965 in Islington, London to Anna and Reginald Francois. His father was an engineer and his mother was an Italian au pair. The family moved to Basildon, Essex in 1971. His secondary education was at the Nicholas Comprehensive School (now part of James Hornsby School). He studied history at the University of Bristol and graduated in 1986. Francois stated that he joined the Conservative Party when he was studying in Bristol. He went on to complete a master's degree in War Studies at King's College London in 1987.

In 1983, whilst at university, he joined the Territorial Army (TA), the part-time reserve force of the British Army. Given the service number of 523962, Francois was commissioned in December 1985 and served with the Royal Anglian Regiment until September 1989, reaching the rank of Lieutenant.

After university, Francois became a management trainee with Lloyds Bank. He then worked as a political consultant for the lobbying company Market Access International in 1988, leaving to set up his own lobbying firm, Francois Associates, in 1996, which he closed when he was elected as MP in 2001.

Local political career
He was a member of Basildon District Council for the Langdon Hills ward from 1991 to 1995. On the council, he served as vice-chair of the housing committee from 1992 to 1995.

Parliamentary career
Francois stood for the Brent East constituency in the 1997 general election. He came second to the incumbent, Labour's Ken Livingstone. He contested the election to be the Conservatives' prospective parliamentary candidate for Kensington and Chelsea in the 1999 by-election. The contest was won by Michael Portillo, who garnered 60% of the final ballot.

He was selected as the party's candidate for Rayleigh in the 2001 general election. Francois won the seat with a majority of 8,290. He made his maiden speech on 4 July 2001. Francois was re-elected in 2005 with an increased majority of 14,726. The constituency was abolished prior to the 2010 general election. He was elected in the new seat of Rayleigh & Wickford in the election.

He served as a member of the Environmental Audit Select Committee for the duration of his first term in Parliament. He was promoted to become an Opposition Whip in 2003 by Michael Howard; to Shadow Economic Secretary in May 2004; and later to Shadow Paymaster General (10 May 2005 – 3 July 2007) scrutinising HMRC.

He was promoted to be Shadow Minister for Europe on 3 July 2007, and joined the Shadow Cabinet at the January 2009 reshuffle. As Shadow Minister for Europe Francois oversaw the Conservative Party's withdrawal from the EPP grouping in the European Parliament, the creation of the ECR grouping and the Conservative's opposition in the House of Commons to the Treaty of Lisbon, which he spoke against on many occasions including on 5 March 2008 in the debate to pass the European Union (Amendment) Act 2008.

When the Conservatives and Liberal Democrats joined in a coalition government following the 2010 general election, he was appointed Vice-Chamberlain of the Household, a sinecure given to a Government Whip that entails being kept as 'captive' at Buckingham Palace when the Queen opens Parliament. He joined the Privy Council on 9 June 2010.  In 2011, he was a member of the special Select Committee set up to scrutinise the Bill that became the Armed Forces Act 2011.

He was appointed Minister of State for Defence Personnel, Welfare and Veterans in the Ministry of Defence in September 2012. From October 2013 to May 2015, he was Minister of State with responsibility for the armed forces, cyber activity, and force generation.

Following the 2015 general election, he became Minister of State for Communities and Resilience and Minister for Portsmouth at the Department for Communities and Local Government.

Francois left the government after Theresa May was appointed Prime Minister, but she appointed him to conduct a review into the use of reserves in the Army.

Since September 2017, Francois has sat on the Defence Select Committee and is a former member of the Administration Committee, the Committee of Selection, Defence Committee and Environmental Audit Committee. He is a vice-president of Conservative Friends of Poland.

In 2019, Francois became one of the 28 so called Tory "Brexit Spartans" who voted against Theresa May's Brexit deal all three times it was put to the House of Commons.

At the 2019 general election, Francois was re-elected with an increased majority of exactly 31,000 (7,550 votes more than in the 2017 election) and achieved over 72% of the vote. In January 2020, he launched a crowdfunding bid with the StandUp4Brexit group to raise money for Big Ben to chime upon the UK's departure from the EU.

On 3 March 2020, Francois was announced as chair of the ERG, succeeding Steve Baker. In this capacity he wrote to Michel Barnier, head of the task force negotiating the post-Brexit relationship between the UK and the EU, a letter titled "A Missive from a Free Country". Barnier replied in an open letter.

In December 2021, he called on Secretary of State for Northern Ireland Brandon Lewis to resign for failing to come through with promised legislation related to veterans.

In November 2022, Labour MP Sarah Owen criticised Francois for using an "outdated and crass racial slur" in the House of Commons when he referred to Japanese people as "Japs". Francois used the term when asking a question on defence, saying: "The Type 26 frigate is literally a world-beating design, which we have exported to both Canada and Australia, and we all want to see it in service as soon as possible. So it is doubly disappointing that, last week, the Department issued a written ministerial statement to say her entry into service is now delayed a further year from October 2027 to October 2028 and the lifetime cost to the programme will be over a quarter of a billion pounds more of taxpayers’ money. Given the defence budget is likely to come under great pressure, why does it take BAE Systems 11 years to build a ship the Japs can build in four.?" 

In reply, Secretary of State for Defence, Ben Wallace, said: "First, just like in Canada, industrial complexes are facing post-covid skills challenges and indeed supply chain challenges—because our ships, just like everybody else’s ships, use international supply chains—and that has got involved in the timetable, which obviously has a knock-on effect on cost. However, where there have been supply chain problems, my team and I have personally made sure I have not only visited the manufacturer to grip the situation, but discussed it with the prime. It is incredibly important when we place these contracts, and the contracts are for billions of pounds, that the prime contractors, be they British or foreign, deliver in accordance with them. That is why, in future contracts, I have made sure not only that we do as much as we can to build in Britain, but that we get the primes to invest in the infrastructure of British yards and the skills base of British people to ensure this does not happen again."

Francois later said he was complimenting the Japanese shipbuilding industry and used the word "Japs" as an abbreviation for Japanese.

Personal life
Francois married Karen Thomas at Langdon Hills, Basildon, in June 2000. They divorced in 2006. 

Francois married Olivia Sanders – the current Mayor of Brentwood, Essex – on 11 June 2022.

References

External links
 
 Rayleigh Conservatives
 Rayleigh Conservative Club

1965 births
Living people
Alumni of the University of Bristol
Alumni of King's College London
Royal Anglian Regiment officers
Conservative Party (UK) MPs for English constituencies
UK MPs 2001–2005
UK MPs 2005–2010
UK MPs 2010–2015
UK MPs 2015–2017
British politicians of Italian descent
People from Basildon
People from Islington (district)
Members of the Privy Council of the United Kingdom
People from Rayleigh, Essex
Military personnel from London
UK MPs 2017–2019
UK MPs 2019–present
British Eurosceptics